Giles of Bridport was a medieval Bishop of Salisbury.

Giles was archdeacon of Berkshire in the diocese of Salisbury as well as Dean of Wells before he was elected bishop between 13 February and 15 April 1256 and consecrated on 11 March 1257. He died in December 1262, probably on the 13th. He founded De Vaux College in 1262 and he may have been the brother of Simon de Bridport, who was treasurer of the diocese of Salisbury. He is commemorated by a statue in niche 169 on the west front of Salisbury Cathedral.

Citations

References
 British History Online Bishops of Salisbury accessed on 30 October 2007
 

Bishops of Salisbury
Archdeacons of Berkshire
13th-century English Roman Catholic bishops
1262 deaths
Deans of Wells
Year of birth unknown